Kazuo Nakamura  was a Japanese-Canadian painter and sculptor (born Vancouver October 13, 1926; died Toronto April 9, 2002) and a founding member of the Toronto-based Painters Eleven group in the 1950s. Among the first major Japanese Canadian artists to emerge in the twentieth century, Nakamura created innovative landscape paintings and abstract compositions inspired by nature, mathematics, and science. His painting is orderly and restrained in contrast to other members of Painters Eleven. His idealism about science echoed the beliefs of Lawren Harris and Jock Macdonald.

Life

Kazuo Nakamura was born in Vancouver, British Columbia, as a second-generation Japanese Canadian (nisei). He began his art training in 1940 at the Vancouver Technical Secondary School. Jock Macdonald, who was teaching there, is believed to have taught Nakamura design and also tutored him in drawing and painting. Nakamura was a teenager when he became one of the 22,000 Japanese Canadians interned during World War II. At the  internment camp in Tashme, near Hope, British Columbia, Nakamura continued to create artworks, such as the painting Tashme at Dusk, July/August 1944 (1944). Although he was able to paint only at day’s end, art provided an essential escape. Forbidden by the Canadian government from returning home to British Columbia after the war, Nakamura lived in Hamilton, Ontario, briefly before settling in Toronto in August 1947. He studied at Toronto's Central Technical School (1948–51), and was a founding member of Painters Eleven. Although sharing in the other members' use of painterly abstraction, Nakamura's work was distinguished within the group by his use of simpler structures and monochromatic colours. While he is largely known as a member of Painters Eleven, Nakamura achieved tremendous success outside of the group and was internationally recognized by the late 1950s.

Work
 
Influenced by fellow Painters Eleven member Jock Macdonald's interest in László Moholy-Nagy's reading of science, Nakamura was concerned with science, time and space. Nakamura described himself as seeking a "fundamental universal pattern in all art and nature" reflected in his "inner structure" paintings from the 1950s. In the 1970s and 1980s he increasingly emphasized his grid paintings based on number structures, which came to involve the Fibonacci number system. To Nakamura, these laboriously inscribed works were a quest for some ultimate order in the apparent chaos of the universe. He regarded the Number Structure series as his most important body of work, although his blue/green landscapes, which he began producing in the 1960s, are his most popular and recognizable paintings.

Commissions

His work is part of the permanent collection at Toronto's Lester Pearson International Airport and Ontario Provincial Queen's Park Complex.

International exhibitions

In 1983 and 1984 as part of Ontario Heritage Foundation's Firestone Collection Nakamura's work toured London (UK), Paris and Madrid. In 1991 he exhibited at the New Canadian Embassy in Tokyo and in 1992 at Ader Tajan, Art Contemporain du Canada, Espace Chapon in Paris.

Honours

In 2000 Nakamura was made an honorary fellow at the OCAD University and in 2004 he was the subject of the posthumous retrospective Kazuo Nakamura: A Human Measure at the Art Gallery of Ontario in Toronto. He was made a member of the Royal Canadian Academy of Arts.

References

Bibliography
 Brandon, Laura. War Art in Canada: A Critical History. Toronto: Art Canada Institute, 2021. ISBN 978-1-4871-0271-5
Hatch, John G. Kazuo Nakamura: Life & Work. Toronto: Art Canada Institute, 2021. ISBN 978-1-4871-0258-6
Hill, Richard William, John Mighton, Kazuo Nakamura and Kerri Sakamoto. Kazuo Nakamura: A Human Measure. Toronto: Art Gallery of Ontario, 2004. 
 Holubizky, Ihor and Kazuo Nakamura. Kazuo Nakamura: The Method of Nature. Oshawa, Ontario: Robert McLaughlin Gallery, 2001.

External links
Artist's page at Christopher Cutts Gallery in Toronto
Basic information and images
Gallery of Nakamura's work
Work "Two Horizons" (1968) at Queen's Park in Toronto

20th-century Canadian painters
Canadian male painters
20th-century Canadian sculptors
Canadian male sculptors
20th-century Canadian male artists
Artists from Vancouver
Japanese-Canadian internees
1926 births
2002 deaths
Members of the Royal Canadian Academy of Arts
Canadian abstract artists